The Night of the Mayas (Spanish: La noche de los mayas) is a 1939 Mexican film. It was directed by Chano Urueta. The film, which is called a "Mexican tragedy" set in the times of the Mayas, is remembered today for its musical score by the Mexican composer Silvestre Revueltas.

Cast
 Arturo de Córdova as Uz
 Stella Inda as Lol
 Isabela Corona as Zev
 Luis Aldás as Miguel
 Miguel Ángel Ferriz Sr. as Yum Balam
 Rodolfo Landa as Taz
 Daniel (Chino) Herrera as Apolonio
 Rosita Gasque as Pil 
 Max Langler as H‐Men, hombre sabio 
 Jacoba Herrera as Nuc, anciana
 Ch. Sánchez as Chumín

Music

The music is best known in arrangements for the concert hall, although the composer did not live to make such an arrangement himself.

Concert suites
In 1946 the German composer Paul Hindemith made a visit to Mexico where he met Rosaura Revueltas, sister of Silvestre. This led to his concert arrangement in two movements.

It is scored for larger forces than Hindemith's version and includes a large percussion section.

Recordings

The version by Hindemith was recorded by the Tempus Fugit Orquesta conducted by Christian Gohmer, and released by Quindecim Records in 2014.

Limantour was recorded conducting the Orquesta Sinfónica de Guadalajara. Later recordings include one by the Orquesta Sinfónica Simón Bolívar, conducted by Gustavo Dudamel, which was released on Deutsche Grammophon in 2010.

References

Further reading
Lienhard, Martin. "La Noche de Los Mayas: Indigenous Mesoamericans in Cinema and Literature, 1917–1943", translated by Peter Cooke and Philip Derbyshire. Journal of Latin American Cultural Studies 13, no. 1 (2004): 35–96.

External links

 La noche de los mayas at Hoycinema.com 

1939 films
Films scored by Silvestre Revueltas
1930s Spanish-language films
Films directed by Chano Urueta
Mexican black-and-white films
Mexican drama films
1939 drama films
1930s Mexican films